Eurofins Scientific SE is a French group of laboratories headquartered in Luxembourg, providing testing and support services to the pharmaceutical, food, environmental, agriscience and consumer products industries and to governments.

Eurofins Group has an international network of ca. 900 laboratories across 61 countries and a portfolio of over 200,000 validated analytical methods for characterising the safety, identity, purity, composition, authenticity and origin of products and biological substances. Eurofins also provides clinical diagnostic testing services and in-vitro diagnostic products. Through research and development, in-licensing and acquisitions, the Group draws on the latest developments in the field of biotechnology and analytical sciences.

History
Eurofins Scientific was founded in 1987 with 4 employees. Eurofins derived the "fins" of its name from the French version of SNIF-NMR: Fractionnement Isotopique Naturel Spécifique par Résonance Magnétique Nucléaire or FINS-RMN.  During this start up period (1987 to 1997), the SNIF-NMR patent was registered.

From 1997, Eurofins' strategy was to acquire state-of-the-art laboratories with unique technologies, scientific expertise and potential for global growth. As Eurofins' revenues reached €7 million, its IPO on the Paris Stock Exchange helped fund the organisation's rapid geographic expansion. The network expanded to eight new countries and grew to include over 50 laboratory sites. Leading positions were built up in core markets (Food Testing, BioPharma Product Testing and Environment Testing) and key segments such as genomics and contaminant testing.

In 2001, Eurofins TAG was developed in response to the mad cow disease (BSE) crisis, allowing, for the very first time, genetic fingerprints to be used to confirm that each package of meat in a supermarket originated from an animal that had been tested free of BSE.

From 2002, Eurofins started developing its infrastructure. It structured its laboratories as independent, entrepreneur-led companies, which eventually achieved global leadership positions in R&D, testing, nurturing scientific talent, and funding research.

Having established the building blocks to support the network’s growth, focus turned to starting up and expanding operations in new markets and geographies, including China, Sweden, Norway and Ireland, between 2005 and 2008.

Eurofins was the first international laboratory group to offer bird flu virus (H5N1) testing in food in 2005. Later developments included the Animal ID DNA Test, which was quickly validated by Eurofins and offered as a routine test to customers in the wake of the horsemeat crisis in 2013. This made Eurofins the first company able to verify at high throughput the absence of undeclared horsemeat in a wide range of food products.

In 2012, Eurofins celebrated 25 years since its IPO and became a billion-euro annual revenue business. In the same year, Eurofins became the global market leader in discovery pharmacology, and a global leader in the Japanese genomics testing and Brazilian food testing markets.

In 2013, Eurofins became the second largest food testing service provider in the U.S.A. In July 2014, it entered the specialty clinical diagnostics market for the first time with the acquisition of ViraCor-IBT, one of the largest independent laboratories servicing the specialty diagnostic market segment and the leader in testing to support organ transplant programmes.

Eurofins completed close to 60 acquisitions in 2017 and close to 50 acquisitions in 2018, enabling it to become a €4 billion company. At the same time, Eurofins became the market leader in food and environment testing in North America.

In September 2021, Eurofins announced that Eurofins Scientific would be included in the CAC 40 Index; the Group's market capitalisation stood at more than €23.5 billion. Based on September 2021 share prices, this would put Eurofins in the 29th position in the CAC 40 index ranked by market capitalisation.

Key developments
On 1 July 2014, Eurofins purchased Viracor-IBT Laboratories from Ampersand Capital Partners for $255 million. The company is now known as Eurofins Viracor.

In May 2015, Eurofins acquired QC Laboratories in the USA and Experchems in Canada as part of its North American expansion strategy.

In June 2015, Eurofins announced the acquisition of Biomnis in France for €220 million. In September 2017, Eurofins Scientific acquired EAG Laboratories (Evans Analytical Group), a scientific services company that serves technology and life-science-related industries. On 5 March 2018, the Pennsylvania Department of Environmental Protection announced to collect a $600,000 penalty from Eurofins QC, LLC (Eurofins QC in Montgomery County, Pennsylvania) for falsifying whole effluent toxicity test (WETT) results.

Eurofins purchased Nanolab Technologies Inc, a service laboratory for the Silicon Valley industry, on 2 August 2018.

Eurofins acquired MET Labs on 11 January 2018, which enabled the network to have a Nationally Recognized Test Laboratory as established by OHSA. At the end of 2018, a deal was finalized between Eurofins and the JSTI Group for the acquisition of TestAmerica Environmental Services, LLC, adding 24 laboratories and 40 service centers to the Eurofins environmental testing network.

On 3 June 2019, Eurofins reported that some of its IT systems were infected with ransomware and many servers and systems were taken offline. Eurofins paid the ransom after heavy disruption to their services. Court hearings were postponed as the forensics division was unable to take new samples.

Eurofins acquired Japanese genetics analysis company GeneTech, a leader in the specialist field of non-invasive pre-natal testing in August 2020.

In September 2020, Eurofins announced the acquisition of SunDream Group in Taiwan, which specialises in environmental analyses. The acquisition allowed Eurofins to become the leading player in the environmental analyst market in the country.

In February 2021, Eurofins acquired Beacon Discovery, a California-based company specialising in drug research. The group focuses on “G protein coupled receptors,” a major class of proteins in human cells, on which many molecules can act.

Eurofins announced the acquisition of the American DNA Diagnostics Centers (DDC), a group specializing in genetic testing, in June 2021.

In September 2022, Eurofins launched Eurofins Sustainability Solutions, which brings together a wide range of Eurofins companies’ sustainability offerings in one place.

Product authentication
The company has developed an exclusive method of food analysis, testing and authentication that has thwarted the counterfeiting of food goods, and also cigars. The company's testing can also detect food contaminants.

See also
 Assay
 Site-Specific Natural Isotope Fractionation-Nuclear Magnetic Resonance (SNIF-NMR) used by Eurofins for the analysis of wines and other alcoholic beverages

References

External links
 Short History of Eurofins Scientific

Biotechnology companies established in 1987
Biotechnology companies of France
Companies based in Luxembourg City
Companies listed on Euronext Paris
CAC 40
French companies established in 1987
1997 initial public offerings